Mondello is a small borough of the city of Palermo in the autonomous region of Sicily in Southern Italy. 

Its beach lies between two cliffs called Mount Gallo and Mount Pellegrino. The town was originally a small fishing village situated on marshland, but at the end of the 19th century it grew into a tourist destination. A number of Liberty style villas on the seafront promenade have made it one of the gems of Art Nouveau in Europe.

History
Until the beginning of the 20th century, Mondello was an unhealthy marsh enclosed by two headlands: the Mount Pellegrino described by Johann Wolfgang von Goethe as "the most beautiful promontory in the world" and Mount Gallo. The ancient fishing village laid at the foot of the latter. It was also home to a tonnara (or almadraba), one of many scattered along the West coast of Sicily. The tonnara is no longer active.

At some point, a Palermitan nobleman had the idea to drain the swamp. Prince Francesco Lanza di Scalea, with the help of a Belgian real estate company, built a plant for the drainage of swampy waters to the sea. The newly rehabilitated areas, previously occupied by the swamp, underwent a process of expansion and evolution from the 18th to the 20th centuries.

From 1912 onwards, Mondello became the seat of the high bourgeoisie and the aristocracy. The nobility of the city fostered the construction of several exclusive and aristocratic circles, the construction of villas and the exploitation of lush gardens. King Ferdinand of Bourbon called it "a corner of paradise". Eventually, the beach of Mondello was born.

Attractions

Mondello is characterized by a sandy bay that binds the two promontories, called Monte Gallo and Mount Pellegrino, with a coastline of white sand that nowadays is approximately 1.5 kilometers long. The Natural Reserve of Capo Gallo and the reserve of Monte Pellegrino are nearby. Today the area is known for its beach, and for its Art Nouveau villas, which characterize the architecture of the burough, making it a landmark in the history of international modernism.

Bibliography

 P.Hardy, A. Bing, A. Blasi, C. Bonetto, K. Christiani, Italy, pp. 759–60, Lonely Planet.
 W. Dello Russo, Spiagge in Sicilia, Sime Books.
 Michelin, M. Magni, M. Marca, Sicilia, p. 90, La Guida Verde 2013
 Sicilia, p. 39, Lonely Planet, EDT 2013

References

Subdivisions of Palermo
Tourist attractions in Palermo
Art Nouveau architecture in Italy